Nathaniel Appleton (9 December 1693 – 9 February 1784) was a Congregational minister in Cambridge, Massachusetts.
 
Appleton was born in Ipswich, Massachusetts. He was educated at Harvard, taking his degree in 1712, studied theology, and was ordained on October 9, 1717, succeeding William Brattle as Congregational minister in Cambridge. From 1717 to 1779 he was one of the corporation of Harvard University, and in 1771 was granted the degree of D.D. from the university; Harvard had given this degree only once, some eighty years before, to President Mather. In 1729, Appleton was recorded as owning an enslaved man named Pompey. During his long career, Appleton published sermons and occasional discourses, and died, aged 90, in Cambridge, Massachusetts.

Appleton and his son had close ties to present-day Arlington, Massachusetts, then a section of Cambridge known as Menotomy, and according to a local historian the town's Appleton Street was named in their honor.  As part of his employment as minister, he was given "a Lott of Land att Menotomy Called Bare Hill, about 40 acres," located near today's Route 2 and the Lexington border, and probably accessed by today's Appleton Street. (His son, also named Nathaniel Appleton, was a businessman who purchased 250 acres for a "country place" in Menotomy, setting out a circle of trees reflected in today's Park Circle.)

Writings 

 A Thanksgiving sermon on the total repeal of the Stamp-Act, preached in Cambridge, New-England, May 20th, in the afternoon preceding the public rejoicings of the evening upon that great occasion (Boston: Printed and sold by Edes and Gill, 1766)
 Considerations on Slavery: In a Letter to a Friend (1767)

See also
 The First Parish in Cambridge

References

 History of Cambridge, Massachusetts, 1630-1877, With a Genealogical Register, Volume 2, by Lucius Robinson Paige, 1877, page 482.

External links
 

1693 births
1784 deaths
American Congregationalists
American slave owners
Appleton family
Harvard University alumni
People from Ipswich, Massachusetts
People of colonial Massachusetts